Calicountry is the fifth studio album by American country rap duo Moonshine Bandits from California. It was released on February 4, 2014 via Average Joes Entertainment and Suburban Noize Records. It features guest appearances from Big B, Charlie Farley, Colt Ford, Danny "Boone" Alexander, Durwood Black, Jeremy Penick, Sarah Ross and The Lacs. The album peaked at number 126 on the Billboard 200 in the United States.

Track listing

Charts

References

2014 albums
Country rap albums
Moonshine Bandits albums
Suburban Noize Records albums
Average Joes Entertainment albums